This is a list of flag bearers who have represented Malta at the Olympics.

Flag bearers carry the national flag of their country at the opening ceremony of the Olympic Games.

List of flag bearers

See also 
 Malta at the Olympics

References 

Malta at the Olympics
Malta
Olympic flagbearers
Olympic flagbearers